One Deadly Summer is a 1983 French drama film directed by Jean Becker from a screenplay by Sébastien Japrisot, based on Japrisot's 1977 novel of the same name. Isabelle Adjani won a César Award for Best Actress for her performance in this film. The film was successful in France, gaining 5,137,040 admissions and becoming the second highest-grossing film of the year.

Plot
In this tragic tale of misunderstanding, obsession, and increasing madness, Eliane ("Elle"), a beautiful young woman (Isabelle Adjani) settles into a small town in the south of France with her introverted mother (Maria Machado) and physically handicapped father, and soon becomes the subject of wild speculation because of her aloofness and at the same time, her obvious sexuality. The young woman is actually caught up in the desire to avenge the long-ago rape of her mother by three men who had arrived at her isolated house in a van which contained an old piano which they were delivering.

A shy car mechanic (Alain Souchon) becomes enamored of her, and the woman suddenly sees him in a different light when she learns that his father, now dead, was an Italian immigrant who had owned and tried unsuccessfully to pawn the piano. Intent on taking action against the mechanic's family to right the wrong suffered by her mother, the daughter begins to lose her grip on sanity when she finds out that the men she suspects of the rape are actually innocent. In fact, her father had long ago exacted his own vengeance on the real culprits. This knowledge pushes her over the edge, and she has to be institutionalized. Meanwhile, the young mechanic misunderstands what happened and that leads to tragedy; he tracks down and kills the innocent men Elle had suspected of raping her mother, believing them to be responsible for Elle's current condition.

Cast
 Isabelle Adjani as Eliane Wieck, known as "Elle"; she is known by her German mother's maiden name rather than by the surname of her father (Gabriel Devigne), because she was born as the result of her mother being raped by strangers. However, Gabriel subsequently comes to accept Eliane and brings her up as his child.
 Alain Souchon as Fiorimonto "Florimond" Montecciari, known as "Pin-Pon"; he is a volunteer firefighter and "pin pon" is an onomatopoeiac version of a firetruck siren.
 Suzanne Flon as Nine, known as "Cognata"
 Jenny Clève as Madame Montecciari, the mother of "Pin Pon"
 Maria Machado as Paula Wieck Devigne, the mother of Elle
 Evelyne Didi as Calamité
 Jean Gaven as Leballech, the boss of the sawmill
 François Cluzet as Mickey
 Manuel Gélin as Boubou
 Roger Carel as Henri, known as "Henri IV"
 Michel Galabru as Gabriel Devigne, the father of Elle
 Martin Lamotte as Georges Massigne
 Marie-Pierre Casey as Mademoiselle Tussaud, the home nurse
 Cécile Vassort as Josette
 Édith Scob as La doctoresse
 Maïwenn Le Besco as 'Elle' as a child

Production
The film was shot in the villages around Gordes: Saint Saturnin d'Apt, Murs, and Villars.

Soundtrack
The original music was written by Georges Delerue. Yves Montand sings his "Trois petites notes de musique", a song that was originally performed by Cora Vaucaire in The Long Absence.

Reception
The film was successful in France, gaining 5,137,040 admissions and becoming the second highest-grossing film of the year. It received four César Awards.

The film received mixed reviews from English-speaking critics. Variety said that "often questionable in matters of credibility and wobbly in its dramatic conception, pic is nonetheless fairly engrossing, thanks to Isabelle Adjani, astonishing in the central role." The New York Times chief film critic Vincent Canby remarked that Adjani "looks smashing in a series of flimsy little dresses" but "the plot... is less complicated than devious." Time Out said the film was "directed with verve", and though it "rarely departs from the commercial mainstream, but within those conventions it operates with assurance, subtlety and plenty of surprises."

Awards

César Awards, France, 1984
Winner
César Best Actress – Isabelle Adjani
Best Editing – Jacques Witta
Best Supporting Actress – Suzanne Flon
Best Writing – Adaptation – Sébastien Japrisot
Nominated
César Best Actor – Alain Souchon
Best Director – Jean Becker
Best Film – Jean Becker
Best Music Written for a Film – Georges Delerue
Best Supporting Actor – François Cluzet

References

External links
 
 

1983 films
1983 drama films
1980s erotic drama films
1980s French films
1980s French-language films
Films based on crime novels
Films based on French novels
Films based on works by Sébastien Japrisot
Films directed by Jean Becker
Films featuring a Best Actress César Award-winning performance
Films featuring a Best Supporting Actress César Award-winning performance
Films scored by Georges Delerue
Films set in the 1970s
French erotic drama films
French rape and revenge films
TF1 Films Production films